Zegna is an Italian luxury fashion house.

Zegna may also refer to:

 Oasi Zegna, natural territory located in the Biellese Alps, Piedmont, Italy
 Ermenegildo Zegna (fashion entrepreneur), an Italian entrepreneur and manager